Axel Hager (born 14 March 1969) is a beach volleyball player from Germany, who won the bronze medal in the men's beach team competition at the 2000 Summer Olympics in Sydney, Australia, partnering Jörg Ahmann. He also represented his native country at the 1996 Summer Olympics in Atlanta.

References

External links
 
 
 

1969 births
Living people
German men's beach volleyball players
Beach volleyball players at the 1996 Summer Olympics
Beach volleyball players at the 2000 Summer Olympics
Olympic beach volleyball players of Germany
Olympic bronze medalists for Germany
Olympic medalists in beach volleyball
People from Fehmarn
Medalists at the 2000 Summer Olympics
Cal State Northridge Matadors men's volleyball players
Sportspeople from Schleswig-Holstein